Route 105 is a major east-west arterial route in the city of Winnipeg. It runs through the suburbs of Fort Rouge, River Heights, Tuxedo, and Charleswood. It is the eastern extension of Provincial Road 241, which runs westward to the communities of Headingley and Lido Plage. Within the city boundaries it connects the residential and light industrial areas west-southwest of downtown with the Pembina Highway and downtown.

Route description
Route 105 begins at the Pembina Highway and runs westward as Grant Avenue through Fort Rouge, River Heights, and Tuxedo, then passes through the Assiniboine Forest while multiplexed with Route 96. It then becomes Roblin Boulevard, passing through central and west Charleswood before meeting the city limits at the Perimeter Highway. The road continues both as Roblin Boulevard and as Provincial Road 241 until it reaches the unincorporated community of Lido Plage, at which point it joins Provincial Road 424.

Grant Avenue was named for Cuthbert Grant, a prominent Métis leader and the Sheriff of Assiniboia in 1839. Roblin Boulevard is named for Sir Rodmond Roblin, Premier of Manitoba from 1900 to 1915.

Major intersections
From east to west:

References

105
Tuxedo, Winnipeg
Charleswood, Winnipeg